The Progressive Conservative Party of Saskatchewan is a conservative political party in the Canadian province of Saskatchewan. Prior to 1942, it was known as the Conservative Party of Saskatchewan. Members are commonly known as Tories.

History

Early years, 1905–1934
It was the Saskatchewan successor to the eastern half of the North-West Territories Conservatives. The Conservative Party of Saskatchewan's first leader, Frederick W. A. G. Haultain, was so upset at sections of the federal legislation that created the province relating to immigration, education, and natural resources that he renamed the party the Provincial Rights Party for the 1905 and 1908 general elections. The party reverted to the Conservative name for the 1912 election, after which Haultain left politics to become Chief Justice of Saskatchewan. Its share of the popular vote declined from 32% to 5% between 1905 and 1921.

The Conservative Party's fortunes began to improve when James T.M. Anderson became leader in 1924. Anderson united opponents of the governing Liberal Party, and led the party to its best performance in the first half of the twentieth century in the 1929 election, when it won 36% of the popular vote and 24 out of 63 seats. Despite having fewer seats than the Liberals, the Conservatives were able to form a coalition government with Progressive Party Members of the Legislative Assembly (MLAs) and independents, and Anderson became Premier.

Anderson was able to use the racial and religious animosity created by the rise of the Ku Klux Klan in Saskatchewan to gain support for Conservative policies on immigration and education. In 1928, Liberal Premier James Garfield Gardiner claimed that the Klan was a tool of the Conservative Party. The united opposition brought the Liberal government to defeat in the 1929 general election. The Anderson government introduced amendments to the Schools Act banning French as a language of instruction, and the display of religious symbols in Catholic schools. The Klan convention in 1930 applauded the Anderson government’s amendments to the School Act.

Political wilderness, 1934–1975
The "Co-operative government", as it was called, was defeated in the 1934 election, and the Conservative Party lost all of its seats in the Legislative Assembly of Saskatchewan. This loss can be attributed to several factors:
 the controversy over the government's School Act;
 the government's inability to deal with the Great Depression dust bowl which wiped out the province's agrarian economy; and
 the unpopularity of the federal Conservative government of R. B. Bennett.

With the rise of the Co-operative Commonwealth Federation (CCF), politics in the province became polarized between the Liberals and the CCF. The CCF became the "New Democratic Party" in 1961. The Conservatives were frozen out of the provincial legislature for decades. Even the presence of future Prime Minister John Diefenbaker, who represented a Saskatchewan riding, was not enough to reverse this trend.

No Conservative was elected as a Member of the Legislative Assembly (MLA) until thirty years later when the party won a single seat in 1964 election. It lost that foothold three years later in the 1967 election.

Return to the Legislature, 1975–1982
The Tories returned to the legislature in the 1975 election. The Progressive Conservatives won 7 seats to the Liberals' 15 and the NDP's 39.

Several Liberals crossed the floor to the PC's prior to the 1978 election, in which the Liberals were wiped out and the Tories became the Official Opposition with 17 seats to the governing NDP's 44.

Devine government, 1982–1991
In the 1982 election, the Progressive Conservatives under Grant Devine formed a majority government for the first time, taking 55 out of 64 seats – still the second-biggest majority in Saskatchewan history. It was only the second Tory-led government in the province's history. They were re-elected with a somewhat reduced majority in the 1986 election, but were defeated in the 1991 election, due to large budgetary deficits, an unpopular imposition of harmonized sales taxes, and a scheme entitled "Fair Share Saskatchewan" to decentralize civil service functions from Regina and privatize crown corporations.

Expenses scandal, 1991–2005
In the years following their defeat, 14 Progressive Conservative MLAs and two caucus workers were convicted of fraud and breach of trust for illegally diverting hundreds of thousands of dollars from government allowances in a phony expense-claim scam. During inquiry into the scandal, many innocent party members were placed under heavy scrutiny. Jack Wolfe died by suicide, faced with the agony of possibly being scrutinized for wrongdoing himself, or having the testify against his former colleagues. Although one NDP MLA was ensnared in the scandal, the Tories' image was badly damaged by this scandal and has never recovered. Although they managed to win five seats in the 1995 election, this total was less than both the NDP and the resurgent Liberals.

Most former members and supporters (including then-leader Bill Boyd) joined the Saskatchewan Party in 1997. The new party was derisively called the "Saska-Tories" by Premier Roy Romanow and others who saw it as a repackaged version of the Tories — a perception that was attached to the Saskatchewan Party for several years. While the Progressive Conservative Party essentially went dormant at this point, it was not formally dissolved. The party was believed to retain a substantial amount of money, which it would forfeit to the provincial government if it ever lost its registration. Since Saskatchewan electoral law requires a party to run at least 10 candidates in provincial elections to retain its registration, a hand-picked group under the nominal leadership of Iris Dennis ran paper candidates in the next two provincial elections to ensure that the party stayed alive.

In the September 16, 1999 election, the party nominated 14 candidates, who collected 1,609 votes, 0.4% of the provincial total. Its best result was in Saskatoon Nutana, where Patrick L. Smith received 518 votes (7.6%). In the November 5, 2003 provincial election, the party nominated 11 candidates, who received a total of 665 votes, which was 0.16% of the provincial total. In 2003, their best result was in Saskatoon Centre, where Betty Korkin received 153 votes and 2.62% of the vote.

Revival, 2005–present
In June 2005, the party announced that it was taking applications for new members, and that it would hold a meeting of members to decide the future of the party. In the meantime, changes to provincial electoral laws passed during the previous Legislature decreased the number of candidates the party needs to run in general elections from ten to two.

On May 27, 2006, the party held a weekend convention. Forty-two delegates attended the convention in Saskatoon and voted to resurrect the Progressive Conservative Party. Delegates elected Lori Isinger as party president, and picked Rick Swenson, a minister in the Devine government, to serve as interim leader. The next order of business would have been to use the money that was put into a trust before the party was effectively put into hibernation. The party had trouble regaining access to this money, and accused the trustees of conspiring with the Saskatchewan Party so the PC party wouldn't be able to run many candidates or a serious campaign, and thus not compete with the Saskatchewan Party for votes in the next election. The party sued the trustees and the Saskatchewan Party to get at their funds.

The party ran five candidates in the 2007 election. Swenson and other party members kept a relatively low profile but did some modest campaigning. The party collected 832 votes (0.18% of the total). Its five candidates in the 2011 election won a total of 1,315 votes (0.33% of the total).

The party ran 18 candidates in the 2016 election, its largest number since 1995. Even though they contested a number falling far short of the 61 total ridings, the party still collected 5,571 votes, or 1.28% of the total vote, managing 10 third-place finishes. Of the 18 ridings contested, the PC party surpassed 12 Liberal candidates and 12 Green candidates, and far exceeded the average number of votes that these parties received per contested riding.

Swenson announced in November 2016 that he will be stepping down as leader as soon as the party organizes a leadership convention. On November 3, 2018, Ken Grey was chosen as the new leader of the party. In the 2020 provincial election, the party won no seats in the legislature.

Election results

Party leaders
Frederick W. A. G. Haultain (1905-1912)
Wellington Bartley Willoughby (1912–17)
Donald Maclean (1917–21)
John Salkeld (1921–24) (house leader)
James T. M. Anderson (1924 – October 28, 1936)
John Diefenbaker (October 28, 1936 – 1940)
Herbert E. Keown (1940–44)
Rupert Ramsay (1944 – October 12, 1949)
Alvin Hamilton (October 12, 1949 – 1957)
 Vacant (1957–1958)
Martin Pederson (October 28, 1958 – 1968)
 Vacant (1968–70)
Ed Nasserden (February 28, 1970 – March 18, 1973)
Dick Collver (March 18, 1973 – November 9, 1979)
Grant Devine (November 9, 1979 – October 8, 1992)
Rick Swenson (October 8, 1992 – November 21, 1994) (interim)
Bill Boyd (November 21, 1994 – August 8, 1997)
Iris Dennis (August 8, 1997 – May 31, 2006) (interim)
Rick Swenson (May 31, 2006 – November 3, 2018)
Ken Grey (November 3, 2018 – January 18, 2021)
Vacant (January 18, 2021 – November 15, 2022)
Rose Buscholl (November 16, 2022 – present) (interim)

See also

Politics of Saskatchewan
Progressive Conservative Party of Saskatchewan leadership conventions.
Provincial Rights Party
Northwest Territories Liberal-Conservative Party

References

External links
Party Website

Provincial political parties in Saskatchewan
Conservative parties in Canada